The Nicaragua Under 17s football team, more commonly known as La Azulita, is controlled by Nicaraguan Football Federation and represents Nicaragua in international Under 17 or youth football competitions.

History

Current players
The following squad were called up for recent 2019 CONCACAF U-17 Championship

Fixtures and results
legend

2019

Competitive record

FIFA U-17 World Cup

CONCACAF U-17 Championship

''*Draws include knockout matches decided on penalty kicks

References

under-17